Washingtonian Pub. Co. v. Pearson, 306 U.S. 30 (1939), was a United States Supreme Court case in which the Court held the Copyright Act of 1909's deposit requirement did not require immediate deposit, or deposit before infringement occurs, in order to bring a suit for infringement.

In 2018, the Supreme Court will hear Fourth Estate Public Benefit Corp. v. Wall-Street.com, which will answer the similar issue of "whether a copyright owner may commence an infringement suit after delivering the proper deposit, application, and fee to the Copyright Office, but before the Register of Copyrights has acted on the application for registration."

References

External links
 

1939 in United States case law
United States copyright case law
United States Supreme Court cases
United States Supreme Court cases of the Hughes Court